The Women's 3 metre springboard competition at the 2017 World Championships was held on 20 and 21 July 2017.

Results
The preliminary round was started on 20 July at 10:00. The semifinals were held on 20 July at 15:30. The final was started on 21 July at 18:30.

Green denotes finalists

Blue denotes semifinalists

References

Women's 3 metre springboard